Adrián López Rodríguez (born 25 February 1987), also known as Piscu, is a Spanish former professional footballer who played as a central defender.

Club career

Deportivo
López was born in As Pontes de García Rodríguez, A Coruña. After emerging through the ranks of local Deportivo de La Coruña, he spent his first two senior seasons with their reserves. During 2007–08, he benefitted from injury to starter Alberto Lopo and made 15 La Liga starts for the first team, the first coming on 30 September 2007 in a 1–0 away loss against RCD Espanyol.

On 22 February 2009, again starting and already a full member of the main squad, Piscu scored his first goal for the Galicians, in a 1–1 home draw with Valencia CF. He finished the campaign with eight league appearances.

Wigan Athletic
In the summer of 2010, Deportivo unilaterally renewed Piscu's contract, keeping him at the club until June 2011. The player, not having signed the contract himself, believed he was a free agent and did not turn up for training; while waiting for the dispute to be resolved by FIFA, he trained with Premier League side Wigan Athletic, and the entity eventually ruled that he was a free player and was allowed to join another team.

On 31 December 2010, Piscu eventually joined the Latics on a free transfer, signing a deal until the end of 2010–11. He made his debut in the third round of the FA Cup, starting in a 3–2 win at Hull City on 8 January 2011. He first appeared in the league on 5 March, in a 1–0 away defeat to Manchester City.

López made a total of four appearances in his first year and, in early August 2011, extended his contract at the DW Stadium for a further two years. He left at the end of the 2012–13 season as the team suffered relegation, with only 19 competitive matches to his credit.

Montreal Impact
On 26 July 2013, López signed with Major League Soccer club Montreal Impact for an undisclosed fee. He made his competitive debut on 21 August in a CONCACAF Champions League match against Heredia Jaguares de Peten, which ended in a 1–0 loss and with him being sent off for a challenge on Charles Córdoba. Additionally, he failed to appear in the league season after suffering a torn anterior cruciate ligament to his right knee during a training session.

Later years
López spent the 2015–16 campaign in the Danish Superliga, appearing rarely for Aarhus Gymnastikforening and being released in early May 2016. The following year, he stayed in the country but moved down to the 1st Division, signing with FC Fredericia.

Honours
Wigan Athletic
FA Cup: 2012–13

References

External links

1987 births
Living people
Spanish footballers
Footballers from As Pontes de García Rodríguez
Association football defenders
La Liga players
Segunda División B players
Tercera División players
Deportivo Fabril players
Deportivo de La Coruña players
SD Compostela footballers
Premier League players
Wigan Athletic F.C. players
CF Montréal players
Danish Superliga players
Danish 1st Division players
Aarhus Gymnastikforening players
Spanish expatriate footballers
Expatriate footballers in England
Expatriate soccer players in Canada
Expatriate men's footballers in Denmark
Spanish expatriate sportspeople in England
Spanish expatriate sportspeople in Canada
Spanish expatriate sportspeople in Denmark